Tanya Segal (born 1957) is the first full-time female rabbi in Poland and the first female rabbi in Czech Republic (Ostrava) http://www.kehila-ostrava.cz/) Prior to her rabbinic post in Czech Republic, Segal was the first female rabbi in Poland. Segal is also a professional theatrical director, actress, singer, and guitar player (GITIS, The State (Russian) Institute of Theatre Arts, M.A. 1987).

Biography
Segal was born in Russia in 1957. She made Aliyah to Israel in 1990, and was ordained to a rabbi in 2007 at the Hebrew Union College in Jerusalem (HUC).  In 2006 her play And Her Name Was Heather was first performed, at the Hebrew Union College campus; it combines a commentary on the Book of Ruth with the story of American convert Tamar (Heather) Havilio. She also studied at Tel Aviv University, where she produced the master's thesis From Zoharic Text to Liturgical Performance: The Role of Weeping in the Performance of Eikha. In her both theses diploms she created the theoretical basis of the Midrash Theatre which she established in Krakow at 2008, one year later after her rabbinic ordination. The Midrash Theatre performances in Poland became the innovative form of study she constantly used in her rabbinical teaching practice. Today the Midrash Theatre under Tanya Segal's directing is a professional Jewish Theatre in Krakow opened for the public. In December 2007 she became the second rabbi (senior rabbi Burt Schuman) of Beit Warszawa congregation in Warsaw.   Since 2009 she has been a rabbi at Beit Krakow, a Progressive Jewish community of Krakow. Since August 2019 she is a rabbi of the Jewish Community of Ostrava (Czech Republic).

Other
The art exhibit “Holy Sparks”, which opened in February 2022 at the Heller Museum and the Skirball Museum, featured 24 Jewish women artists, who had each created an artwork about a female rabbi who was a first in some way. Linda Soberman created the artwork about Segal.

See also
Timeline of women rabbis

References

1957 births
Living people
21st-century Polish rabbis
Czech Reform rabbis
Jewish theatre
Polish Reform rabbis
Reform Jewish feminists
Reform women rabbis